The 2021–22 Columbia Lions women's basketball team represented Columbia University during the 2021–22 NCAA Division I women's basketball season. The Lions, led by sixth-year head coach Megan Griffith, played their home games at Levien Gymnasium and were members of the Ivy League. They finished the season 25–7, 12–2 in Ivy League play to finish in second place behind Princeton. They advanced to the Ivy League women's tournament finals but lost to Princeton 59–77. The Lions accepted a bid to play in the 2022 Women's National Invitation Tournament. and made it to the quarterfinals, losing to Seton Hall 75–78.

Previous season
The 2020-21 Ivy League season was cancelled due to the COVID-19 pandemic. In the 2019-20, the Lions finished the season 17–10, 8–6 in Ivy League play to finish in fourth place. They qualified for the 2020 Ivy League women's basketball tournament, but the tournament was cancelled due to COVID-19.

Roster

Schedule

|-
!colspan=9 style=| Exhibition

|-
!colspan=9 style=| Non-conference regular season

|-
!colspan=9 style=| Ivy League regular season

|-
!colspan=9 style=| Ivy League Tournament

|-
!colspan=9 style=| WNIT

See also
 2021–22 Columbia Lions men's basketball team

References

Columbia Lions women's basketball seasons
Columbia
Columbia
Columbia
Columbia